Mesophyllum expansum is a species of red alga belonging to the family Hapalidiaceae.

Description
Illuminated by artificial light they show a beautiful pink color, with hanging branches.

Distribution
This species is widespread in the Mediterranean Sea.

Bibliography
Cabioch, J. & Mendoza, M.L. (2003). Mesophyllum expansum (Philippi) comb. nov. (Corallinales, Rhodophytes), et mise au point sur led Mesophyllum des mers d'Europe. Cahiers de Biologie Marine 44: 257–273.
Guiry, M.D. (2009). Mesophyllum expansum (Philippi) Cabioch & Mendoza, 2003. In: Guiry, M.D. & Guiry, G.M. (2009). AlgaeBase. World-wide electronic publication, National University of Ireland, Galway.

References

Corallinales
Biota of the Mediterranean Sea
Species described in 2003